The 2003 South American Cross Country Championships took place on February 22–23, 2003.  The races were held at the Circuito de Ñu Guazú in Asunción, Paraguay.

Complete results, results for junior and youth competitions, and medal winners were published.

Medallists

Race results

Senior men's race (12 km)

Note: Athletes in parentheses did not score for the team result.  (n/s: nonscorer)

Men's short race (4 km)

Note: Athletes in parentheses did not score for the team result.  (n/s: nonscorer)

Junior (U20) men's race (8 km)

Note: Athletes in parentheses did not score for the team result.  (n/s: nonscorer)

Youth (U18) men's race (4 km)

Note: Athletes in parentheses did not score for the team result.  (n/s: nonscorer)

Senior women's race (8 km)

Note: Athletes in parentheses did not score for the team result.  (n/s: nonscorer)

Women's short race (4 km)

Note: Athletes in parentheses did not score for the team result.  (n/s: nonscorer)

Junior (U20) women's race (6 km)

Note: Athletes in parentheses did not score for the team result.  (n/s: nonscorer)

Youth (U18) women's race (3 km)

Note: Athletes in parentheses did not score for the team result.  (n/s: nonscorer)

Medal table (unofficial)

Note: Totals include both individual and team medals, with medals in the team competition counting as one medal.

Participation
According to an unofficial count, 95 athletes from 8 countries participated.

 (38)
 (3)
 (8)
 (12)
 (7)
 (20)
 Perú (3)
 (4)

See also
 2003 in athletics (track and field)

References

External links
 GBRathletics

South American Cross Country Championships
South American Cross Country Championships
2003
South American Cross Country Championships
Cross country running in Paraguay
2000s in Asunción
International sports competitions in Asunción
February 2003 sports events in South America